The Longwood Medical and Academic Area (also known as Longwood Medical Area, LMA, or simply Longwood) is a medical campus in Boston, Massachusetts. Flanking Longwood Avenue, LMA is adjacent to the Fenway–Kenmore, Audubon Circle, and Mission Hill neighborhoods, as well as the town of Brookline.

It is most strongly associated with Harvard Medical School, the Harvard T.H. Chan School of Public Health, the Harvard School of Dental Medicine, and other medical facilities such as Harvard's teaching hospitals, but prominent non-Harvard institutions are located there as well.  Long known as a global center of research, institutions in the Longwood Medical Area secured over $1.2 billion in NIH funds alone, in FY 2018 which exceeds funding received by 44 states.

Hospitals and research institutions
 Beth Israel Deaconess Medical Center
 Boston Children's Hospital
 Brigham and Women's Hospital
 Dana–Farber Cancer Institute
 Joslin Diabetes Center
 Massachusetts Mental Health Center
 New England Baptist Hospital
 Wyss Institute for Biologically Inspired Engineering

Schools and colleges
 Boston Latin School
 Emmanuel College
 Harvard Medical School
 Harvard School of Dental Medicine
 Harvard T.H. Chan School of Public Health
 Massachusetts College of Art and Design
 Massachusetts College of Pharmacy and Health Sciences
 Simmons University
 Wentworth Institute of Technology
 Boston University Wheelock College of Education & Human Development
 Winsor School

Transportation
LMA is served by two subway stations at opposite ends of Longwood Avenue:
"Longwood" (on the MBTA Green Line's "D" branch) and
"Longwood Medical Area"  (on the "E" branch).
Several public bus routes serve the area and commuter rail service is available at nearby Ruggles Station. MASCO offers shuttle buses (generally for affiliated personnel only) around the Longwood Medical Area and between Harvard's Cambridge Campus and the Medical Campus (M2). The M2 shuttle is free for passengers holding a Harvard ID.

Energy
LMA receives electrical power, cooling, and heating from a trigeneration (CCHP) facility, the Medical Area Total Energy Plant (MATEP).

References

External links

Medical Academic and Scientific Community Organization
 The Diaries of John Hull, Mint-master and Treasurer of the Colony of Massachusetts Bay

Academic enclaves
Biomedical districts
Harvard Medical School
Laboratories in the United States
Medical districts
Neighborhoods in Boston